The Lutheran Church of Rwanda (Itorero Ry' Abalutheri Ry' Urwanda, Église luthérienne du Rwanda) is a Lutheran denomination in Rwanda. It is a member of the Lutheran World Federation, which it joined in 2002. It is also a member of the Conseil protestant du Rwanda. Its president is Bishop Evalister Mugabo.

External links 
Lutheran World Federation listing

Lutheran denominations
Lutheranism in Africa
Lutheran World Federation members